Sergey Yuryevich Gorlanov (born 6 June 1996) is a Russian ski orienteering competitor.

He won a bronze medal in men's sprint at the 2017 World Ski Orienteering Championships.

References

1996 births
Living people
Russian orienteers
Ski-orienteers
Universiade gold medalists for Russia
Universiade silver medalists for Russia
Universiade bronze medalists for Russia
Competitors at the 2019 Winter Universiade
21st-century Russian people